Shaw is an unincorporated community in Marion County, Oregon, United States, on Oregon Route 214.

Shaw was a station in the Waldo Hills between Macleay and Aumsville on the Oregonian Railway (later the Southern Pacific Railroad and today the Willamette Valley Railway). In 1881 the station was named "Waldo Hills" but the name was changed to "Shaw" in 1891 to match the post office.

Shaw post office was established in 1887 and named for Angus Shaw, the first postmaster. Shaw was from Ontario, Canada and settled in the area 1876. The post office closed in 1937.

In 1915 Shaw had two grain mills, which no longer exist. As of 2005, Shaw had 18 dwellings, a machine shop, a general store building, a warehouse and a church.

The Shaw area was settled by pioneer Daniel Waldo in the 1840s.

References

External links
Historic images of Shaw from Salem Public Library

Unincorporated communities in Marion County, Oregon
1881 establishments in Oregon
Populated places established in 1881
Unincorporated communities in Oregon